Wayne Scargill (born 30 April 1968) is an English former professional footballer who played as a full back.

Career
Born in Barnsley, Scargill played for Frickley Athletic, Bradford City and Emley.

Personal life
He was the nephew of Arthur Scargill.

References

1968 births
Living people
English footballers
Frickley Athletic F.C. players
Bradford City A.F.C. players
Wakefield F.C. players
English Football League players
Association football fullbacks